Beyond Vaudeville was a New York City public-access television show that ran from 1986 to 1996. The talk/variety show featured amateur talents and nostalgia-inducing celebrities housed within the confines of a crowded, Manhattan-based public access television station. Awkward host Frank Hope and his violence-prone sidekick David Greene created strange and uncomfortably compelling television. Frank was a fidgety collector-type who enjoyed Wacky Packages and Star Trek; David a silent behemoth who only spoke out of anger. For many of the episodes, Joey the Dancing Monkey (played by John Walsh) gets called by Frank to come out and dance, and various puppets appear behind the seats of the guests while they get interviewed, sometimes attempting to annoy David. Celebrity guests, including the likes of Tiny Tim (musician), Fred Willard, and Bobby “Boris” Pickett (“Monster Mash”), shared the stage with amateur singers, dancers, and Klingons, their surprised and befuddled reactions to the talent often mirroring those of the viewers. In 1997, MTV brought the show to cable under the title Oddville, MTV, a fundamentally similar program that featured celebrity guests and bands that were meant to appeal to the youth of today rather than yesterday.

Episodes
1)	Mason Reese, Underdog dancer Suzanne Muldowney (12/9/86)

2)	Al Lewis, poet Gretchen Weiner (3/2/87)

3)	Omer Travers (broke into Yoko Ono's apartment), poet Chairman Steve, comedy team Book n Martino (5/4/87)

4)	Psychic Frederick Davies, singer-songwriter Stryker (7/8/87)

5)  Frank Nastasi (White Fang on Soupy Sales Show), Austin Velez (guest co-host), UFO abductee Gertrude Adams, Cowboy Joe, Glenn & His Friend Flubb  (10/6/87)

6)	Tuli Kupferberg of The Fugs, Chairman Steve, Kevin & His Friend Bub, Glenn & His Friend Flub, Joey the Monkey (1/12/88)

7)	Sammy Petrillo (“Bela Lugosi Meets a Brooklyn Gorilla”), former Burt Reynolds love interest Sen Tuna (2/25/88)

8)	Quentin Crisp, mother-daughter comedy team Coco & Penny, Konstantin Bokov (5/9/88)

9)	Joe Franklin errand boy Chris Deola, Kerima the bellydancer (6/13/88)

10)	Joyce Randolph, comedian Jackie Jason Exit (7/19/88)

11)	Arthur Tracy, actor Marshall Efron (8/30/88)

12)	Joe Franklin, artist Konstantin Bokov, elderly stripper Leola Harlow (10/4/88)

13)	Lisa Sliwa, singer/songwriter Stryker, poet Chairman Steve, Austin Velez (11/22/88)

14)	Michael Musto, actor Joe Fleishaker, sci-fi collector Leslie Holcomb (2/27/89)

15)	Memory expert Harry Lorrayne, Danny the Wonderpony, movie usher Martin Spund (4/18/89)

16)	Billy Dean's Knockouts (5/23/89)

17)	Phoebe Legere, nudists, singer-songwriter Stryker, Underdog dancer Suzanne Muldowney (6/6/89)

18)	Sci-Fi singer Roberta Rogow, Underdog dancer Suzanne Muldowney, singer Ada Love (7/8/89)

19)	Brother Theodore, Uncle Sam impersonator Joe Erdelyi, sci-fi collector Leslie Holcomb (8/19/89)

20)	Ed Herlihy, Lady Betty Aberlin, singer Starlady, T-shirt maker Martin Forro (9/23/89)

21)	Joey Adams, Geoffrey Holder, Mr. Spoons (10/21/89)

22)	Barry Williams, Wavy Gravy, Sukhreet Gabel (10/21/89)

23)	Diver Dan, Rocky Horror Fan Club president Sal Piro, nosewhistler Jim Grosso, comic Al Lawrence (11/18/89)

24)	Little Mike Anderson, musical saw player Moses Josiah, UFO expert (12/6/89)

25)	Prof. Irwin Corey, Lady Betty Aberlin, female Elvis impersonator Dee Nack, driving instructor Bert Rapp, sci-fi collector Phil Depardo (1/20/90)

26)	Judy Carne, Page Morton-Black, cryonicist Curtis Henderson, singer Al Boland (2/17/90)

27) Taylor Mead, Ethyl Eichelberger, Baird Jones, Jack the Fire, Frank's Home Movies (6/23/90)

28)	Terry Sweeney, Flying Nun Fan Club president, Dracula dancer Suzanne Muldowney, sci-fi collector Leslie Holcomb (7/28/90)

29)	Marie Wallace, Dave Van Ronk, UFO expert Ellie Crystal, sci-fi collector Leslie Holcomb (8/18/90)

30)	Fred Willard, Underdog dancer Suzanne Muldowney, poet Wolf Pasmanik, comic Lou Bacala Cary (9/17/90)

31)	Austin Pendleton, Irene the Gong Show Queen of Long Island, singer Ada Love, Raelians, Lady Betty Aberlin (10/27/90)

32)	Singer John Wallowitch, singer Buddy Clayton (12/1/90)

33)	NYC News anchor Sue Simmons, musical saw player Moses Josiah, actress Martha Greenhouse, psychic Morris Fonte (12/10/90)

34)	Audrey Landers, David Peel, Alan Abel, Al Jolson impersonator Rich Curtis (1/26/91)

35)	Warner Wolf, Tiny Tim, The Chordettes, comic Dave West (2/20/91)

36)	Shirley Stoler, Ron Fazio, singer Tommy Ritaco, Robert “Harmonica” Stevens, Pieman Aron Kay (3/16/91)

37)	Dan Lauria, Indian Elvis impersonator Nazar Sayegh, comedian Mildred Katz (4/20/91)

38)	Lew “Clarabell” Anderson, Little Mike Anderson, singer Regis Philbin Jr., sci-fi expert Ronald Held, pogo-stick record holder Ashrita Furman (6/8/91)

39)	Carel Struycken, singer Izzy Fertel, toy collectors Lance and Pat, sci-fi collector Leslie Holcomb (6/25/91)

40)	World's Fastest Hot Dog Eater, poet Wolf Pasmanik, rapper Larry Love, sci-fi expert Ronald Held (7/20/91)

41)	Fred Willard, singer Izzy Fertel, singer Ada Love, bellydancer Kerima, rappers, comedian Dave West, nose-whistler Jim Grosso (7/30/91)

42)	Remo Pisani, singer Buddy Clayton, midget comic Ramon Pena Cartucho, Hawaiian singer Johnny Kai (8/17/91)

43)	Bobby “Boris” Pickett, pierced guy, sci-fi expert Ronald Held, Klingon League of Assault Warriors, singer Austin Velez (9/21/91)

44)	Tiny Tim, Benny Bell, tattoo experts Huggy Bear & Eek, Renaissance Man George Kayatta, Mr. Lucky & Stanley the Pig (10/19/91)

45)	Sammy Petrillo, sci-fi expert Ron Held, comic Mikhail Bleyckman, bowling alley expert Bill Newman, horror expert John Link, sci-fi collector Leslie Holcomb (11/9/91)

46)	Xmas Special. Wallowitch, William M. Gaines, Marilyn Monroe conspiracy expert M. Vinson Hayes, sci-fi collector Leslie Holcomb (12/7/91)

47)	Bern Nadette Stanis, comic Mikhail Bleyckman, sci-fi singer Roberta Rogow, songwriter Stryker, Tiny Tim goes bowling (1/11/92)

48)	Joey Faye, sci-fi expert Ronald Held, actor Joe Fleishaker, Marilyn Monroe conspiracy expert M. Vinson Hayes (3/27/92)

49)	Pat Cooper, FDR Impersonator, Madonna impersonator Queerdonna, Trayman, Walt Paper (6/4/92)

50)	Arthur Tracy, sci-fi expert Steve Maurer, Ice Bear Kingdom, Marilyn Monroe conspiracy expert M. Vinson Hayes, Trayman (7/16/92)

51)	Underdog dancer Suzanne Muldowney, William Brown, singer Alan Chusid, Trayman (8/15/92)

52)	Alison Steele, Chauncey Howell, anchor Marvin Scott, William Brown, Bagpipe player, comic Dave West (9/15/92)

53)	Ron Palillo, William Brown, Trayman, Champ the Wonderdog, sci-fi expert Ronald Held (10/17/92)

54)	Barton Heyman, William Brown, movie collectors Mike Tower and Arthur Ritzer, dancer Jimmy Del Rio (12/22/92)

55)	Kitty Carlisle Hart, William Brown, Trayman, The Greater Gotham Gaylaxians, songwriter Stryker (2/27/93)

56)	Singing nun Sister Beata, singer Margarita Pracatan, artist Hoop, sci-fi collector Leslie Holcomb, Austin Velez (7/6/93)

57)	Virginia Graham, Sir Monti Rock III, artist Hoop, Frank Sinatra fan Bernice Perry, singer Tommy Ritaco (8/7/93)

58)	Kaye Ballard, Lara Jill Miller, William Brown, singer Red Lightning, comic Arthur of New York (9/11/93)

59)	Larry Storch, Banjo-Playing Priest George Swanson, nose-whistler Jim Grosso, Trayman, inventor Mr. Marchand (11/20/93)

60)	Kim Hunter, Chauncey Howell, singer Margarita Pracatan, singer Red Lightning, angels expert (12/18/93)

61)	Michael Berryman, actress Katey Dierlam, artist Ned Sontaag, sci-fi expert John Link, sci-fi collector Leslie Holcomb (1/8/94)

62)	Shirley Jones, Marty Ingels, Trayman, Red Lightning (3/7/94)

63)	Rick Derringer, comic Marty Gangursky, Three Stooges Fan Club, Chinese opera singer Chen Tsung Kit, Austin Velez (4/13/94)

64)	Jimmy Breslin, poet Chairman Steve, Yankees fan Freddie Sez, Al Jolson singer Rich Curtis, actor Marty Gangursky, Kenneth Keith Kallenbach (7/16/94)

65)	Underdog dancer Suzanne Muldowney, Kenneth Keith Kallenbach, rapper/granny Fruity Nutcake, Marilyn Monroe conspiracy expert M. Vinson Hayes (10/29/94)

66)	Imogene Coca, poet Chairman Steve, “Quiz Show” legend Herbert Stempell, singer Buddy Clayton, comic Neil Connie Wallace (3/25/95)

67)	Jack Riley, Pat McCormick, comic Neil Connie Wallace, raconteur Mr. Sragow, Red Lightning (4/29/95)

68)	Tom Arnold, comic Neil Connie Wallace, Underdog dancer Suzanne Muldowney, raconteur Mr. Sragow (5/13/95)

69)	Soleil Moon Frye, The Singing Cowgirl from Queens, Marilyn Monroe conspiracy theorist M. Vinson Hayes, comic Neil Connie Wallace (7/11/95)

70)	The Del Rubio Triplets, comic Neil Connie Wallace, comic cabbie Al Mustakoff (9/5/95)

71)	Johnnie Whitaker, Billy Barty, Mr. Sragow, poet Chairman Steve (9/15/95)

72)	Singer Joey Marlowe, poet Bingo Gazingo, comic Neil Connie Wallace

73)	Tiny Tim, Arthur Tracy, Izzy Fertel, poet Chairman Steve

74)	Tribute to KISS fans (5/25/96)

75)   Lady Betty Aberlin, Freddie Sez Schulman, Florence Miller Dancers, Neil Connie Wallace, Rich Curtis, Gaylord

Cast
Rich Brown as host Frank Hope
David Greene as co-host David
John Walsh as Joey the Dancing Monkey

Live Stage Shows
Beyond Vaudeville at Speakeasy NYC - Guests Mason Reese, Stryker, Patsy Margolin, Lance Venture, Mildred Budwal, Delta Blues, Thomas Paine, Bert Bedell, Dee Nack the Female Elvis, Michael Kaufman, Billy Jacket, Irene & John Weidenberner, Mr. Feldman (4/18/85)

Beyond Vaudeville at NYU - Guests Danny Bonaduce, Stryker, Suzanne Muldowney, Joseph Erdelyi, Gretchen Weiner, Bert Bedell, Dee Nack the Female Elvis, Chairman Steve, Irene & John Weidenberner, Omer Travers, Lance Venture, Thomas Paine, Mr. Feldman (4/30/86)

Beyond Vaudeville at NYU - Guests Al Lewis, Coco & Penny, Irene Weidenberner, Chairman Steve, Dee Nack the Female Elvis, Dr. Lawrence Biris, Omer Travers, Mr. Feldman, Book N Martino, Suzanne Muldowney, Thomas Paine (4/20/87)

Beyond Vaudeville at NYU - Guests Adam West, Suzanne Muldowney, Stryker, Mr. Feldman, Dee Nack the Female Elvis, Thomas Paine, John & Irene Weidenberner, Konstantin Bokov (4/15/88)

Beyond Vaudeville at NYU - Guests Sukhreet Gabel, Stryker, Kerima the Bellydancer, Thomas Paine, Ada Love, Danny the Wonderpony, Dee Nack the Female Elvis, Suzanne Muldowney, Coco & Penny, Chairman Steve, Mr. Feldman (4/11/89)

Beyond Vaudeville at NYU - Guests Peter Tork & Quentin Crisp, Stryker, Kerima the Bellydancer, Thomas Paine, Little Mike Anderson, Danny the Wonderpony, Dee Nack the Female Elvis, Suzanne Muldowney, Professional Nosewhistler Jim Grosso, Mr. Feldman (4/19/90)

Beyond Vaudeville at Stand Up New York - Guests Little Mike Anderson, Stryker, Kerima the Bellydancer, Thomas Paine, Moses Josiah & His Musical Saw, Suzanne Muldowney, Wolf Pasmanik, Dee Nack the Female Elvis, Joey the Monkey, Danny the Wonderpony, Professional Nosewhistler Jim Grosso, Irene Weidenberner (5/6/91)

Beyond Vaudeville at Caroline's Comedy Club - Guests Ron Palillo, Stryker, Moses Josiah & His Musical Saw, Thomas Paine, Suzanne Muldowney, Izzy Fertel, Joey the Monkey, Danny the Wonderpony, Little Mike Anderson, Dee Nack the Female Elvis, Professional Nosewhistler Jim Grosso, Chairman Steve (5/11/92)

Beyond Vaudeville at Caroline's Comedy Club - Guests Barbara Feldon, Stryker, Suzanne Muldowney, Moses Josiah & His Musical Saw, Trayman, Jimmy Del Rio, Izzy Fertel, Dee Nack the Female Elvis, Benny Bell, Professional Nosewhistler Jim Grosso, Queerdonna (4/26/93)

Beyond Vaudeville at Caroline's Comedy Club - Guests Pat Cooper, Suzanne Muldowney, Red Lightning, Professional Nosewhistler Jim Grosso, Jimmy Del Rio, Stryker, Filksinger Roberta Rogow, Dee Nack the Female Elvis, Moses Josiah and his Musical Saw, Joey the Monkey, Benny Bell, Trayman, Izzy Fertel and Tiny Tim (10/28/93)

Beyond Vaudeville at Caroline's Comedy Club - Guests Carol Shaya, Red Lightning, Professional Nosewhistler Jim Grosso, George Swanson, Suzanne Muldowney, Fruity Nutcake, Stryker, Joey the Monkey, Irene Weidenberner, Kenneth Keith Kallenbach, Chen Tsun Kit, Margarita Pracatan, Dee Nack the Female Elvis, Moses Josiah and his Musical Saw (12/5/94)

References

American public access television shows
American television shows featuring puppetry
1986 American television series debuts
1996 American television series endings
Television shows filmed in New York (state)
Local talk shows in the United States
1980s American variety television series
1990s American variety television series
Local music television shows in the United States